Ibadan Grammar School is a secondary school in the city of Ibadan, Nigeria. It is currently located at Molete area, close to St. David grammar school.

History
Established in March 31st 1913. It is among the notable oldest secondary school in Ibadan. The School is affiliated with the Ibadan Anglican Church. During the school's formative years, it was patronised by many of Ibadan's educated elites who sent their children there for schooling. In the first 31 years of its establishment, the school only accepted male students, It officially became co-ed in 1941. In the 1950s and 1960s, the Higher School Certificate was awarded to students who completed sixth form.
The first principal of the school was Alexander Babatunde Akinyele.

Notable alumni
Mike Adenuga
FOM Atake
Ayo Rosiji
Michael Omolewa
Abdul Hamid Adiamoh
Alex Ibru
Olusegun Agagu
Bola Ige

References

External links

1913 establishments in the Southern Nigeria Protectorate
Educational institutions established in 1913
Schools in Ibadan
Secondary schools in Oyo State
History of Ibadan